Aidis Kruopis (born 26 October 1986) is a Lithuanian former professional road cyclist.

Major results

2005
 3rd  Team pursuit, UEC European Under-23 Track Championships
2006
 3rd  Team pursuit, UEC European Under-23 Track Championships
 8th Overall Olympia's Tour
2007
 2nd Antwerpse Havenpijl
 5th Riga Grand Prix
 5th Grote Prijs Stad Zottegem
2008
 2nd Overall Dookoła Mazowsza
 4th Overall Five Rings of Moscow
 4th Paris–Mantes-en-Yvelines
 5th Tartu GP
2010
 1st Dwars door de Antwerpse Kempen
 1st Schaal Sels
 2nd Kampioenschap van Vlaanderen
 3rd Road race, National Road Championships
 4th Münsterland Giro
 8th Overall Delta Tour Zeeland
 9th Antwerpse Havenpijl
 9th Dwars door Drenthe
 10th Grote Prijs Jef Scherens
2011
 1st Grote 1-MeiPrijs
 1st Schaal Sels
 1st Omloop van het Waasland
 1st Stage 2 Tour of Belgium
 3rd Grand Prix de Denain
 4th Dwars door de Antwerpse Kempen
 5th Handzame Classic
 5th Beverbeek Classic
 5th Rund um Köln
 5th Memorial Rik Van Steenbergen
 8th Overall Ronde van Drenthe
 10th Omloop van het Houtland
2012
 Tour du Poitou-Charentes
1st  Points classification
1st Stages 1 & 2
 1st Stage 3 Tour of Norway
 1st Stage 4 Tour de Pologne
 1st Stage 2 (TTT) Eneco Tour
 2nd Road race, National Road Championships
 7th Overall Tour de l'Eurométropole
 9th Overall Tour of Qatar
2013
 1st Stage 2 Tour of Turkey
 2nd Grote Prijs Wase Polders
2014
 1st  Sprints classification Tour de Langkawi
2015
 1st  Road race, National Road Championships
 1st Antwerpse Havenpijl
 5th Halle–Ingooigem
 7th Ronde van Overijssel
 9th Overall Rás Tailteann
1st  Mountains classification
1st Stages 4 & 8
 9th Ronde van Noord-Holland
 10th Overall Ronde de l'Oise
2016
 1st  Overall Paris–Arras Tour
1st Stages 1 & 2
 1st Dorpenomloop Rucphen
 1st Gooikse Pijl
 1st Ronde van Overijssel
 3rd Heistse Pijl
2017
 10th Grote Prijs Stad Zottegem

References

External links

 
 
 

1986 births
Living people
Lithuanian male cyclists
Presidential Cycling Tour of Turkey stage winners